The Split Rock River is a  tributary of the Kettle River in eastern Minnesota, United States.

Split Rock River was named from its steep, rocky banks.

See also
List of rivers of Minnesota

References

External links
Minnesota Watersheds
USGS Hydrologic Unit Map - State of Minnesota (1974)

Rivers of Minnesota
Rivers of Aitkin County, Minnesota
Rivers of Carlton County, Minnesota